Taneyevka is a rural locality (a selo) in Krasnoyarsky Selsoviet, Sterlitamaksky District, Bashkortostan, Russia. The population was 121 as of 2010. There are 3 streets.

Geography 
Taneyevka is located 17 km northeast of Sterlitamak (the district's administrative centre) by road. Novy Krasnoyar is the nearest rural locality.

References 

Rural localities in Sterlitamaksky District